Docking protein 6 is a protein that in humans is encoded by the DOK6 gene.

Function

DOK6 is a member of the DOK (see DOK1; MIM 602919) family of intracellular adaptors that play a role in the RET (MIM 164761) signaling cascade (Crowder et al., 2004 [PubMed 15286081]).

References

Further reading